The surname Young has several origins.

In some cases – particularly in England, Northern Ireland, and Scotland – the surname is derived from the Middle English yunge, yonge ("young"); this particular surname usually originated to distinguish a younger son. 

In other cases, the surname is an anglicisation of any number of like-sounding, or cognate surnames in other languages. For example: the German Jung and Junk; the Dutch Jong; in Sweden, Ljung; and the French Lejeune and Lajeunesse. The surname can also be a form of the French Dion or Guyon.

In yet other cases, it is a romanization of Chinese Yang (/). Very rarely, it may be a romanization of the Korean surnames Yong or Yeong; however, if seen in a Korean name, it is far more likely that Young is a portion of the given name instead.

There have been five baronetcies created for persons with the surname Young, one in the Baronetage of England, one in the Baronetage of Great Britain and three in the Baronetage of the United Kingdom. As of 2014 four of the creations are extant. They are Young Baronetcy.

Young is the 49th-most common surname in England; 22nd in Scotland and 11th in New Zealand.

Notable people with this surname include:

A 

Ace Young (born 1980), singer and American Idol (Season 5) finalist from Colorado, United States
Adam Young (disambiguation), several people
Adrian Young (born 1969), American member of the band No Doubt
Adrian Young (American football) (born 1946), American football player
Adrian Young (footballer) (1943–2020), Australian rules footballer
Adrienne Young, singer-songwriter from Nashville, Tennessee, United States
Al Young, 
Alan Young, 
Sir Alban Young, 9th Baronet (1865–1944), British envoy to Central America and to Balkan countries
Aleana Young, Canadian politician
Alex Young (disambiguation), several people
Alexander Young (disambiguation), several people
Alfred Young (disambiguation), several people
Allen Young (1827–1915), English master mariner and explorer
Allyn Abbott Young (1876–1929), American economist
Alse Young (died 1647), American alleged witch
Alton Milford Young (1884–1950), American leader of the Ku Klux Klan
Alvin Young (born 1975), American expatriate professional basketball player
Amanda Young, fictional character in the Saw film series
Amita Marie Young (born 1980), Thai singer and actress
Ammi B. Young (1798–1874), American architect
Dr. Dre (born Andre Young in 1965), American rapper/hip-hop producer
 Andre Young (American football) (born 1953), football player
 Andre Young (basketball) (born 1990), American basketball player
Andrew Young (disambiguation), several people
Angus Young (born 1955), lead guitarist of the Australian band AC/DC
Anna Irwin Young (1873–1920), American mathematician
Annabel Young (born 1956), New Zealand politician
Anne Sewell Young (1871–1961), American astronomer and professor
Anthony Young (disambiguation), several people
Archie Young (1906–1980), Scottish footballer
Aretas William Young (1778–1835), British Army officer and colonial administrator of the early nineteenth century
Arthur Young (disambiguation), several people
Ashley Young (born 1985), English football player
Audrey Young (1922–2012), American actress
Austin Young (born 1966), American artist/photographer
Avery Young (born 1992), American football player

B 

Barbara Young (disambiguation), several people
Barbara Young, Baroness Young of Old Scone (born 1948), British politician
Bellamy Young (born 1970), American television actress and singer
Bert Young (Herbert Young, 1899–1976), English footballer
Bill Young (1930–2013), Florida congressman
Bill Young (New Zealand politician) (1913–2009), New Zealand politician
Bob Young (businessman), Canadian CEO of Red Hat
Brad Young (disambiguation), several people
Brian Young (drummer), American member of Fountains of Wayne
Brigham Young (1801–1877), American second President of The Church of Jesus Christ of Latter-day Saints
Brigham Young Jr. (1836–1903), son of the above, American missionary and church leader
Britney Young, American actress
Bryan Young (disambiguation), several people
Bryant Young (born 1972), American football player
Bryce Young (born 2001), American football player
Buddy Young (1926–1983), American football player
Burt Young (born 1940), American actor
Byron Young (born 1998), American football player

C 
Carey Young (born 1970), British artist
Carleton Young (1905–1994), American actor
Carlson Young (born 1990), American actress
Cathy Young (born 1963), American journalist
Charle Young (born 1951), American football tight end
Charles Augustus Young (1834–1908), American astronomer
Charles Burney Young (1824–1904), South Australian pastoralist and politician
Charles E. Young (born 1931), chancellor of UCLA (1968–1997), president of the University of Florida (1999–2003)
Charley Young (born 1952), American football running back in the National Football League
Charlie Young (disambiguation), several people
Chase Young (born 1999), American football player
 Chase Young (cricketer) (born 1988), South African cricket player
Chavez Young (born 1997), Bahamian professional baseball player
Chic Young (1901–1973), American cartoonist who created the popular, long-running comic strip Blondie
Chris Young (disambiguation), several people
Christopher Young (born 1957), American film and television composer
Cliff Young (disambiguation), several people
Clinton Young (born 1986), Australian rules footballer
Coleman Young (1918–1997), former mayor of Detroit
Colville Young (born 1932), Governor General of Belize
Craig Young (born 1957), Australian representative rugby league footballer
 Craig Young (cricketer) (born 1990), Irish cricketer
 Craig Robert Young (born 1976), British actor and singer
Curt Young (born 1960), Major League Baseball pitcher and the pitching coach for the Boston Red Sox
Curtis Young (born 1986), American football member of the National Football League
Cy Young (disambiguation), several people

D 
Damon Young, Australian philosopher
Daniel Young (cricketer) (born 1990), English cricketer
Danny Young (basketball) (born 1962), American basketball player
Danny Young (actor) (born 1986), UK actor
Danny Young (pitcher, born 1971), American baseball player
Danny Young (pitcher, born 1994), American baseball player
Dareke Young (born 1999), American football player
 Darin Young (born 1973), American darts player
Darren Young (disambiguation), several people
Darrel Young (born 1987), American football fullback
Darwin Young (1924–2020), American politician
David Young (disambiguation), several people
David Young, Baron Young of Graffham (1932–2022), British Conservative politician and businessman
Dean Young (disambiguation), several people
Delwyn Young (born 1982), American baseball player
Delmon Young (born 1985), baseball player
Derek Young (born 1980), Scottish professional footballer
Dmitri Young (born 1973), baseball player
Donald Young (disambiguation), several people
Don Young (1933–2022), Alaskan politician
Donald Young (baseball) (born 1945), baseball player
Donald Young (tennis) (born 1989), professional tennis player from the United States
Doug Young (politician) (born 1940), Canadian politician
Doug Young (ice hockey) (1908–1990), former ice hockey defenceman
Draff Young, former National Basketball Association coach

E 

Earl Young (disambiguation), several people
Ed Young (illustrator) (born 1931), Chinese-born American children's illustrator
Homer Edwin Young (Ed Young Sr., born 1936), American pastor
Edwin Barry Young (Ed Young Jr., born 1961), American pastor
Edward Young (disambiguation), several people, including:
Edward Young (1683–1765), English poet
Eleanor Anne Young (1925–2007), American research scientist and educator
Emily Young (disambiguation), several people
Eric Young (born 1985), guitarist/vocalist of the Canadian rock band Still Life Still 
Eric Young Jr. (born 1985), American baseball player and coach
Eric Young Sr. (born 1967), American baseball player and coach
Ernest Young (disambiguation), several people, includes Ernie Young 
Esme Young (born 1949), English fashion designer
Ethel Louise Young (1883–1974), better known as Mary Forbes, British-American actress
Evelyn Young (1915–1983), American film actress
Ewing Young (1799–1841), American fur trapper and trader

F 

Faron Young (1932–1996), American country music singer
Fifi Young (1914–1975), Indonesian actress
Francis Brett Young (1884–1954), English novelist, poet, playwright, and composer
Fred Young (disambiguation), several people
Fredd Young (born 1961), professional American football linebacker
Freddie Young (1902–1998), British cinematographer
Frederick Young (disambiguation), several people

G 

Gale J. Young (1912–1990), American nuclear engineer
Galen Young (1975–2021), American professional basketball player
Gary Young (disambiguation), several people
George Young (disambiguation), several people
Gerald Young (disambiguation), several people
G. M. Young (1882–1959), British historian
Gig Young (1913–1978), American actor
Gordon Young (artist) (active 1992–), British artist  
Grace Chisholm Young (1868–1944), British mathematician
Graham Young (1947–1990), British serial killer
Greg Young (disambiguation), several people
Gruffydd Young (1370–1435), cleric and a close supporter of Owain Glyndwr during his Welsh rebellion

H 
H. Olin Young (1850–1917), U.S. politician from Michigan
Harold Young (disambiguation), several people
Harriet Maitland Young (1838-1923), British composer
Harry Young (disambiguation), several people
Henry Young (disambiguation), several people
Herbert J. Young, American college basketball and football coach
Horace C. Young (1806–1879), New York politician
Howard Young (born 1948), member of the Legislative Council of Hong Kong and member of Southern District Council
Howard Young Sr. (1879–1971), Indiana Supreme Court Justice

I 

Irad Young (born 1971), American-Israeli soccer player 
Iris Marion Young (1949–2006), American political theorist
Izzy Young (1928–2019), American folk music promoter

J 
Jackie Young (1934–2019), American politician
Jackie Young (basketball) (born 1997), American women's player
Jacob Young (disambiguation), several people
Jahmar Young (born 1986), American basketball player in the Israeli National League
Jake Young (American football) (1968–2002), American football player
James Young (disambiguation), several people
Jane Young (disambiguation), several people
Jane Corner Young (1915-2001) American composer, music therapist and pianist
Jared Young (born 1995), Canadian baseball player
Jason Young (born 1980), Thai actor and singer
Jeff Young (born 1962), American guitarist
Jeremy Young (1934-2022), British actor
Jerome Young (born 1976), American sprint athlete
Jesse Colin Young (born 1941), American singer
Jim Young (disambiguation), several people
Jimmy Young (1918–1974), Northern Irish comedian and actor
Jo-Anne H. Young, American physician, scientist, and journal editor
John Young (disambiguation), several people
Johnny Young (disambiguation), several people
Joe Young (basketball) (born 1992), American basketball player
Jonathan Young (disambiguation), several people, includes Jonathon and Johnathan
Joseph Young (disambiguation), several people
Josiah T. Young (1831–1907), American politician and newspaper editor
Julia Evelyn Ditto Young (1857–1915), American novelist, poet
Juwon Young (born 1996), American football player

K 
Kakani Katija Young, American bioengineer
Katherine Young (1901–2005), American centenarian, world's oldest Internet user
Kenny Young (1941–2020), American songwriter, artist, and producer
Kenny Young (American football) (born 1994), American football player
Keone Young (born 1947), American character actor
Kevin Young (disambiguation), several people
Killian Young (born 1987), Irish sportsperson
Kirsty Young (born 1968), British television presenter
Kit Young (born 1994), British actor
Korleone Young (born 1978), American professional basketball player
Kristeen Young, American singer, songwriter and keyboardist

L 

Lafayette Young (1848–1926), American newspaper reporter, editor, and Senator from Iowa
La Monte Young (born 1935), American musician and composer
Landon Young (born 1997), American football player
Lauren Young (born 1993), Filipino-American actress model and singer
Laurence Chisholm Young (1905–2000), British mathematician
Lee Thompson Young (1984–2013), American actor
Leon Young (born 1967), former police officer and member of the Wisconsin State Assembly
Lester Young (1909–1959), American musician
Linda Young (born 1953), American voice actress
Logan Young (1940–2006), American businessman
Lonnie Young (born 1963), American football player
Loretta Young (1913–2000), American actress
Luke Young (disambiguation), several people

M 

Mabel Minerva Young (1872–1963), American mathematician
Madison Young (born 1980), American pornographic actress and director
Mae Young (1923–2014), American professional wrestler and WWE Ambassador
Mahonri Young (1877–1957), American sculptor
Mal Young (born 1957), British television producer and executive producer
Malcolm Young (1953–2017), Scottish-born Australian guitarist and songwriter, member of the rock band AC/DC
Margaret Young (disambiguation), several people
Marie Grice Young (1876–1959), American passenger on the RMS Titanic and a piano teacher
Mark Aitchison Young (1886–1974), 21st governor of Hong Kong
Martha Strudwick Young (1862–1941), American author
Martin Young (journalist) (born 1947), British television journalist
Marvin Young (born 1967), American rapper better known by his stage name Young MC
Marvin R. Young (1947–1968), American soldier
Megan Young (born 1990), Filipino-American actress
Melissa Ann Young, 2005 Miss USA pageant contestant
Michael Young (disambiguation), several people
Milton Young (1897–1983), United States politician
Mitch Young (born 1961), American football player
Morris Young (entomologist) (1822–1897), Scottish entomologist
 Morris A. Young, sheriff of Gadsden County, Florida from 2004

N 

Naomi Young (born 1976), Australian synchronized swimmer
Nat Young (disambiguation), several people, includes Nathan Young
Ned Young (1766–1800), sailor on HMS Bounty
Nedrick Young (1914–1968), American actor and screenwriter, often blacklisted during the 1950s and 1960s
Neil Young (disambiguation), several people
Neville Young (1940/41–2019), New Zealand lawyer, National Party president
Nicholas Young (disambiguation), several people
Nick Young (disambiguation), several people

O 
Olive Young (1903–1940), American-born actress in China
Oliver Young (1855–1908), British politician
Otto Young (1844–1906), German American businessman
Owen D. Young (1874–1962), American founder of RCA and diplomat; Time Man of the Year for 1929

P 

Paul Young (disambiguation), several people
Patric Young (born 1992), American basketball player
Patrick Young (1584–1652), Scottish scholar and librarian
Pegi Young (1952–2019), American singer-songwriter
Perry Deane Young (1941–2019), American journalist and writer
Peter Young (disambiguation), several people
Phineas Young (1799–1879), American early convert in the Latter Day Saint movement
Polly Young (1749–1799), English soprano, composer, harpsichordist
Polly Ann Young (1908–1997), American actress
Priscilla Young (1925–2006), English social worker

R 
R. Michael Young, politician in Indiana, United States
Rachel Young, several characters
Ralph Young (disambiguation) , several people
Randy Young (born 1954), American football player
Rebecca Young (flag maker), flag maker during the American Revolution
Rebecca Young (politician) (1934–2008), Wisconsin politician and legislator
Rebecca Jordan-Young (born 1963), American sociomedical scientist
Reggie Young (1936–2019), lead guitarist in the American Sound Studios Band and a session musician
Richard Young (disambiguation), several people
Rik Young (born 1978), English actor and dancer
Robert Young (disambiguation), several people
Robin Young (civil servant), British civil servant 
Robin Young, American television and radio personality
Roby Young (born 1942), Israeli association football player
Rod Young, Australian journalist and news presenter
Roger Young (disambiguation), several people
Roland Young (1887–1953), English actor
Rolande Maxwell Young (1927-2015), American composer, pianist and educator
Ronald N. Young, American politician
Ronnie Young (1943–2019), American politician
Rory Young (1972–2021), Zambian-born Irish wildlife conservationist and anti-poaching strategist
Rosa Young (1890-1971), American educator
Ross Young (disambiguation) , several people
Roynell Young (born 1957), professional American football safety and cornerback
Ryan Young (born 1976), American football player

S 
Samuel Young (disambiguation), several people
Scott Young (disambiguation), several people
Sean Young (born 1959), American actress
Sean Young (soccer) (born 2001), Canadian soccer player
Selvin Young (born 1983), American football running back
Sheila Young (born 1950), speed skater and track cyclist from the United States
Shelby Young (born 1992), American film, television and voice actress
Simone Young (born 1961), Australian conductor
Slater Young (born 1987), Filipino-Chinese actor and television personality
Sophia Young (born 1983), Vincentian professional women's basketball player
Stella Young (1982–2014), Australian comedian, journalist and disability rights activist
Stephanie Young, American voice actress who works for anime series of FUNimation Entertainment
Stephen Young (disambiguation), several people
Steve Young (disambiguation), several people, includes Steven Young
Stuart Young (accountant) (1934–1986), chairman of the BBC from 1983 until 1986
Sydney Young (chemist) (1857–1937), British chemistry professor

T 
Tamera Young (born 1986), American basketball player
Terri Young (born 1959), American pediatric ophthalmologist
Thaddeus Young (born 1988), American basketball player
Thomas Young (disambiguation), several people
Tim Young (disambiguation), several people
Tiffany Young (born Stephanie Young Hwang, 1989), American singer, member of the South Korean girl group Girls' Generation
Toby Young (born 1963), British journalist and the author
Todd Young (born 1972), U.S. Senator from Indiana
Tommy Young (born 1947), American professional wrestling referee and retired professional wrestler
Tom Young (disambiguation), several people
Tony Young (actor) (1937–2002), American actor
Trae Young (born 1998), American basketball player
Trevon Young (born 1995), American football player
Trummy Young (1912–1984), American trombonist in the swing era

V 

Val Young (born 1958), American Urban/Dance-pop artist
Van Eps Young (1822–1895), Union Army colonel and Wisconsin politician
Vicki Young, British journalist
Victor Young (1899–1956), American composer
Vince Young (born 1983), American football player
Virginia S. Young (1917–1994), American politician

W 

W. J. Young (1827–1896), Irish businessman
Wallace Young, politician in Newfoundland and Labrador, Canada
Walter X. Young (1918–1942), United States Marine Corps officer and Navy Cross recipient
Wanda Young (1943–2021), American singer of The Marvelettes
Wendell Young (born 1963), Canadian former professional ice hockey goaltender and manager
Whitney Young (1921–1971), American civil rights leader
William J. Young (coach), American college basketball and football coach
Will Young (born 1979), British singer
William Henry Young (1863–1942), English mathematician
William Weston Young (1776–1847), British Quaker entrepreneur, artist, botanist and inventor of the firebrick

Y 

Young baronets, baronets of the UK in the surname of Young
Yvette Young, American guitarist and front-woman of math rock band Covet

See also
Justice Young (disambiguation)
Mayor Young (disambiguation)
Younge
Yung (surname)
Yong (disambiguation)

References 

English-language surnames
Scottish surnames
Surnames of Scottish origin
Surnames from nicknames